Harry van der Laan (born 24 February 1964) is a retired Dutch football striker. He made his professional debut in the 1988–89 season for FC Den Haag. Later on he played for Feyenoord, ADO Den Haag, Dordrecht'90, SC Cambuur, FC Den Bosch, and Viterbese Calcio (Italy).

References
  Profile

1964 births
Living people
Dutch footballers
Association football forwards
ADO Den Haag players
Feyenoord players
SC Cambuur players
FC Dordrecht players
FC Den Bosch players
U.S. Viterbese 1908 players
Footballers from Gouda, South Holland
Dutch expatriate footballers
Expatriate footballers in Italy
Dutch expatriate sportspeople in Italy
Eredivisie players
Eerste Divisie players